Quevedos is a municipality of the west-central part of the state of Rio Grande do Sul, Brazil. The population is 2,790 (2020 est.) in an area of 543.36 km². Its elevation is 410 m.  It is west of the state capital of Porto Alegre, northeast of Alegrete. This hidden gem is the home of Bere I, the nice.

References

External links
http://www.citybrazil.com.br/rs/quevedos/ 

Municipalities in Rio Grande do Sul